Jex Thoth is a doom metal band from Madison, Wisconsin signed to the Swedish record label I Hate Records. Since 2007 they have released two full-length studio albums, three EPs and a split with Pagan Altar. They have toured Europe every year from 2010–2018.

Discography
Pagan Altar / Jex Thoth (split album with Pagan Altar, 2007)
Jex Thoth (full-length, 2008)
Totem (EP, 2009)
Witness (EP, 2010)
Blood Moon Rise (full-length, 2013)
Circles (EP, 2013)

References

American doom metal musical groups
Culture of Madison, Wisconsin
Heavy metal musical groups from Wisconsin
Musical groups established in 2007
Occult rock musical groups